Shai Dahan (born 1979) is an American contemporary painter and street artist who works with painting, drawing, illustrations and sculptures.

In 2007, Dahan moved to New York City where he participated in street-art projects such as the NYSAT, Underbelly Project, and MOM&POPism. He also began to exhibit his art with galleries in Los Angeles, New York, Boston, and Philadelphia.  In July 2012, Shai received recognition for his solo exhibition at the Borås Art Museum in Sweden. He was later featured as the opening keynote speaker at TEDx  Göteborg in October 2012. Shai was also awarded to paint a two-meter United Buddy Bear
for the city of Borås in Sweden.  A limited edition version of the United Buddy Bears were also created by Shai as part of the Borås Buddy Bear Mini Festival in December.

In 2019, Shai painted Sweden's largest outdoor mural in Ryavallen stadium which is over 950 square meters. The mural was painted as part of the European Athletics U20 Championships.

Dahan has been awarded as Ambassador of the city of Borås on June 29, 2019. He has also been named one of Borås 40 Under 40 Most Successful People.

On October 5, 2019 Shai completed The World's Largest Dala Horse (Dalahäst) in the Lower East Side of New York City.
The mural of the Dalecarlian Horse has been measured to be 18 meters (59 feet) high, which has been considered to be the World's Largest Dala Horse artwork as of 2019.

Life and career 
Shai Dahan was born in Haifa, Israel and moved to the United States in 1989.  He began his art career in Los Angeles, where he was highly involved with the skateboarding and surf culture.  At 14, Dahan was introduced to the graffiti culture and started to create graffiti influenced art.  In his early 20s, he continued painting urban influenced art on skateboards and surfboards for projects and charities, including "Life Rolls On" charity in Los Angeles as well as STOKED Mentoring in NYC.

Shortly after moving to Manhattan in 2007, Dahan took part in the New York Street Advertising Takeover through Public Ad Campaign. Since then, Dahan also took part in the Toronto Street Advertising Takeover, as well as the Madrid Street Advertising Takeover.

In 2009, Dahan participated in MOM&POPism, a project presented by Gawker Media to present street-artist painting over the photographs of James and Karla Murray. The project was published as a book in 2011 by Gingko Press.

Dahan also designed the Spirit Award for Stoked Mentoring which honored pro skateboarder Rob Dyrdek.  The award was created by Dahan and given to Rob at the event held in Los Angeles in December, 2009.

In mid 2010, Dahan was part of the Underbelly Project in New York City. He was one of 103 other street-artists invited as a select group to paint an abandoned subway station.  The project, which received much media attention through the New York Times and London Times, was also published as a book titled "We Own The Night" in 2012 through Rizzoli Publication.

After moving to Sweden in late 2010, Dahan continued to exhibit internationally, as well as in Scandinavia including solo exhibitions in Gothenburg and Stockholm and most notably, a solo exhibit at the Modern Art Museum in Borås, Sweden.  This was the first time the museum invited an artist from a graffiti/street-art background.

In June 2011, Dahan painted a live mural at the Gothenburg STCC Race VIP Dinner which included the car racing team of Prince Philip of Sweden.

In January 2012 the Borås Art Museum invited Dahan for a solo exhibition to run from May until September 2012.  The exhibition was the first time the museum invited an artist with a graffiti/street-art background to do an exhibition.  As part of the museum exhibit, Dahan was invited by the city of Borås to add a permanent mural in the city center for their bi-annual International Sculpture Festival.  The mural of two running Dala Horses at the city center at Sandvallplats eventually was used on the publication cover for the city of Borås quarterly magazine for the end quarter of 2012.

In May 2012, Dahan travelled to Bethlehem in palestinian territories. The trip was documented for a documentary film titled "Art on the Seam" and produced by David Freid and is due to release in late 2012.  Dahan painted a large 5 meter mural of an Arab bedouin on the West Bank Barrier wall in Bethlehem after spending 3 days in palestinian territories.  In October 2012, Dahan gave a keynote at TEDx Gotebörg titled "Beyond Borders."   His keynote at TEDx was about his trip to Palestine and the mural he painted there.

In December 2012, Shai was awarded in the city of Borås (Sweden) to create a two-meter United Buddy Bear.  The sculpture was hand painted by Shai with the Swedish Dala Horse patterns that he normally combines to his artworks.  The Buddy Bear was then revealed at a ceremony and installed permanently at the city tourist bureau. The city also introduced a limited edition mini versions of the bear Shai created. The edition mini bears were awarded to local sponsors of the Borås Buddy Bear Mini Festival.

In 2013, Shai co-founded EAST 39th, a Men'swear clothing branch based in Sweden.  The brand designs, markets, and distributes men fashion apparel across Scandinavia.

In 2014 Dahan curated No Limit Borås Street Art Festival in Borås, Sweden.  The festival, which was first announced in September 2013, composed of both international Street-Artists as well as Swedish artists.  Artists who participated in the first No Limit festival included Natalia Rak (Poland), ECB Hendrik (Germany), Kobra (Brazil), Etam Cru (Poland), Ollio (Sweden), Carolina Falkholt (Sweden), Ekta (Sweden), Issac Cordal (Spain).Peeta (Italy) and The London Police (Netherlands).
The festival was funded and organized by BoråsBorås (part of the Borås Stad Municipality). The festival has continued in 2015 and 2017 with both additions featuring new artists painting across the city of Borås.  Shai has remained as founder and Curating Director.

Shai has also worked with Princess Sofia Hellqvist of Sweden at Project Playground, a charitable organisation focusing on providing classes for underprivladged children in the township of Langa, South Africa.  After traveling to South Africa and spending 10 days at the Project Playground Township, Shai created an art exhibition in Stockholm Sweden with a new collection of paintings and drawings.  All proceeds from the art exhibition went to the charity of Project Playground.

He has also met Her Royal Highness Queen Silvia of Sweden at the FEI Horseshow in Gothenburg. Shai painting 9 life-size horse sculptures for the city of Gothenburg in corporation with Gothenburg&Co. to promote the FEI International Horse Show.  The horses were placed across the city of Gotheburg from June to September 2017.  Two of the horses were later auctioned off with the money raised for the Foundation for Queen Silvia's Children's and Youth Hospital.  Shai met Royal Highness Queen Silvia of Sweden at the last day of the Horseshow and presented her with an original painting titled "Hero".

In September 2017, Shai painted an 18 meter mural of Swedish football player Anders Svensson on the outdoor walls of IF Elfsborg Arena.  The Mural was created to honor Svensson for his long career in football as a player for IF Elfsborg.

In early 2018, it was announced that Shai has been commissioned by the city of Ulricehamn to install a 3 meter Bronze Horse Sculpture in the park of the Ulricehamn commune. The sculpture, which is a first Bronze installation for Shai, has been developed since early 2017.  It is planned to be installed in Spring of 2018.

In 2019, Dahan painted Sweden's Largest Mural </ref> in the city of Borås as part of the European Athletic Championships U20.  The wall, which he painted between April and June was over 90 meters long and became Sweden's largest public art mural.

During the birthday celebration of Borås city on June 29, 2019,  it was announced that Shai Dahan has been named as the new Ambassador of the city of Borås.

On October 5, 2019 Shai completed The World's Largest Dala Horse (Dalahäst) in the Lower East Side of New York City.
The mural of the Dalecarlian Horse has been measured to be 18 meters (59 feet) high, which has been considered to be the World's Largest Dala Horse artwork as of 2019.

Techniques and themes 
Throughout his career, Dahan has used different techniques for his outdoor artwork as well as his gallery collection. This includes stencil, wheatpasting, as well as using both acrylics, oils and spraypaint.  Dahan creates hybrids of the urban arts culture mixed with fine art work.  In the past, Dahan created his now much recognizable "BirdGun" series which depicts birds with weapons for their heads.  This theme eventually grew into including other animals with guns for their heads including a series of DeerGuns, Elkguns, and others. 
 

After moving to Sweden in 2010, Dahan began to create a new reinvention of the Swedish Dala Horse  (Dalecarlian horse).  Dahan began to paint the Swedish traditional Dala Horse as a realistic horse that carries the Kurbits colors and patterns of the original wooden statuettes.  Shortly after creating a few illegal Dala Horse wheatpastes around neighborhoods in Sweden, Dahan's paintings began to generate media attention.  After his Dala Horses were published in the newspaper in the city of Borås (Borås Tidning) as well as at Gothenburg Posten publication in Gothenburg, Dahan began to get much attention for his Dala Horse painting and has been mostly recognized in Scandinavian countries for his technique of painting wild horses as the historic Dalahästs.

In 2017 Shai began painting fiberglass horse sculptures for the FEI Horseshow in Gothenburg. In early 2018 it was announced that Shai will be installing his first Bronze sculpture in the city of Ulricehamn. The sculpture, which is nearly 3 meters high, will be part of the city commune on a lease program for 24 months.

Publications

Books 
2017 "The Art of Spraypaint" (Rockport)
2014 "Global Street Art" (Firefly Books)
2012 "We Own The Night" (Rizzoli)
2011 "Mom & Popism" (Gingko Press)

Press

Online

Television
2016 SVT Sverige! 
2013 SVT News
2013 (November) : SVT Philofix TV Barnkanalen (Sweden)
2012 (October) : TV4 (Sweden)

Radio
2017 SverigeRadio
2016 SverigeRadio
2013 (September) : SverigeRadio (Sweden)
2013 (June) : SverigeRadio (Sweden)
2012 (November) : Nyheter P4 Sjuhärad (Sweden)
2011 (August) : Nyheter P4 Sjuhärad (Sweden)
2011 (July) : Nyheter P4 Sjuhärad (Sweden)

Exhibitions

Solo exhibitions

Selected group shows

Other projects

References

20th-century American painters
Living people
1979 births
21st-century American painters
People from Haifa
Israeli emigrants to the United States